Arbërie Nagavci is an Kosovo-Albanian politician, Vetëvendosje member and current Minister of Education, Science and Technology.

Career
Nagavci completed Law studies at the University of Pristina. She also completed her Master of International Law studies at the same university. Nagavci has a long experience in the field of education and upbringing. Since 2010 she has been engaged as a consultant, trainer and advisor for education in various programs in local and international institutions such as: USAID, GIZ, Council of Europe, MEST. From 2014 to 2017 she was the director of the Municipal Directorate of Education in Prishtina.

In the elections of October 6, 2019, Arbërie Nagavci was elected a member of the Assembly of Kosovo and on December 26 of the same year she was nominated and voted for the First Deputy Speaker of the Assembly of Kosovo. Arbërie Nagavci has become part of the Vetëvendosje party in 2013 and is currently a member of the Presidency.

Nagavci was named on 22 March 2021 from the prime minister Albin Kurti as the new Minister of Education, Science and Technology.

Personal life
Nagavci is married and has two children.

References

Members of the Assembly of the Republic of Kosovo
Women government ministers of Kosovo
Ministers of Education, Science and Technology (Kosovo)
Vetëvendosje politicians
Living people
1970 births